The Clásico El Ensayo, also known as the Clásico El Ensayo Mega for sponsorship reasons, is a Group 1 flat horse race in Chile open to three-year-olds, run at Club Hípico de Santiago in Santiago, run over a distance of . First run in 1873, it is the fourth oldest horse race in the Americas (after the Queen's Plate, Travers Stakes, and Belmont Stakes), and the oldest in Latin America. 

It is generally considered the most important horse race in Chile, on par with the Epsom Derby, the American classics,  the Prix de l'Arc de Triomphe in France, and the Gran Premio Carlos Pellegrini in Argentina. It is the first race in the Chilean Triple Crown.

El Ensayo is restricted to only horses that have won at least one race.

History 
The Clásico El Ensayo was first run at a distance of 1200 meters, and has been contested at a variety of distances:

 1200 meters: 1873-1880
 1500 meters: 1881-1883
 1600 meters: 1884-1892
 1800 meters: 1893-1904, 1908
 1900 meters: 1905-1907, 1909
 2000 meters: 1910-1920
 2300 meters: 1921-1925
 2400 meters: 1926 to present
Of the first eight editions contested, six were won by horses sired by Fanfarrón.

The greatest upsets were the 104-1 victory of Parral in 1947 and the 98-1 victory of Cambridge in 2018.

In the early twentieth century, imported horses could run in the race, but by the 1950's, the race was restricted to Chilean-bred horses only, a restriction which lasted until 1984.

The running of 1999 was considered the 'feast of fillies', with fillies coming in first, second, third, and fourth.

Since 2004, the race has been consistently timed to one-hundredth of a second.

In 2020, due to the COVID-19 pandemic, the race was run in December instead of its usual date in late October or early November.

Records 
Speed Record:

 2:23.21 – Wolf (1990)
2:23 2/5 – Monroe (1986)
Most wins by a jockey: 

 7 – Carlos M. Zavala (1877, 1881, 1882, 1883, 185, 1887, 1891, 1895)
 6 – Luis Torres (1995, 1999, 2000, 2003, 2005, 2013)

Most wins by a trainer: 

 7 – Juan Cavieres Mella (1922, 1930, 1934, 1938, 1945, 1954, 1960)
7 – Patricio Baeza (2006, 2009, 2012, 2017, 2019, 2020, 2021)
6 – Juan Cavieres A. (1982, 1983, 1995, 1999, 2000, 2004)

Most wins by an owner (since 1954): 

 4 – Stud Matancilla (1980, 1983, 1989, 1992)
4 – Stud Don Alberto (2006, 2008, 2016, 2021)

Most wins by a breeder: 

 8 – Haras Santa Isabel (1927, 1963, 1965, 1974, 1978)
 8 – Haras Matancilla (1976, 1980, 1983, 1989, 1992, 1999, 2001, 2009)
 7 – Haras de Pirque (1988, 1998, 2000)
 7 – Haras Santa Amelia (1968, 1971, 1982, 1990, 1996, 1997, 2004)

Winners since 1954

Earlier Winners 

 1873: Dinorah*
 1874: Pensamiento*
 1875: Gavilán*
 1876: Reina Mora*
 1877: Danubio
 1878: Pilpilco*
 1879: Moro*
 1880: Godolphin*
 1881: Liguria*
 1882: Pisco
 1883: Miraflores
 1884: Esperanza†
 1885: Cachaporal
 1886: Genovés
 1887: Wanderer*
 1888: Querelema*
 1889: Orompello*
 1890: Rosicler*
 1891: Sky
 1892: Floriana*
 1893: Thunder*
 1894: Triunfo*
 1895: Toldería
 1896: Gibelet
 1897: Oro
 1898: Orbetello*
 1899: Game*
 1900: Paulette*
 1901: Nanette
 1902: Rebeca
 1903: Yolanda*
 1904: Nutmeg* 
 1905: Petrarque*
 1906: Hasard
 1907: Pehuenco*
 1908: Jongleur
 1909: Turín
 1910: Jaque Mate*
 1911: Belle Etoile*
 1912: Iscariote
 1913: Sándalo*
 1914: Rochela
 1915: Dorama
 1916: Captain*
 1917: Epsom
 1918: Cervantes
 1919: Ugolin
 1920: Auvernia
 1921: Flapper
 1922: Greenock
 1923: Almodovar
 1924: Urbión
 1925: El Ocho
 1926: Decurión
 1927: Tutti Frutti
 1928: Melchor
 1929: Pierre Loti
 1930: Freire
 1931: Trampiato
 1932: Kashmir
 1933: Chansonnier
 1934: Quemazón
 1935: Rokof
 1936: E Mago
 1937: Rosarina
 1938: Grimsby‡
 1939: Fouché
 1940: Filibustero
 1941: Rival
 1942: Figaro
 1943: Quemarropa
 1944: Barranco
 1945: Tábano
 1946: Florete
 1947: Parral
 1948: Taimado
 1949: Olimpo
 1950: Empire
 1951: Liberty
 1952: Antar
 1953: Saint Oregon

* "Mestizo"; not a pure Thoroughbred. Many early Chilean races, including El Ensayo, were open to "mestizo" horses who weren't full Thoroughbred.

†Esperanza was declared the winner after the disqualification of Stockwell.

‡Dead-heat between Grimsby and Valeriano, with the win awarded to Grimsby.

References

External links 

 Official website

Horse races in Chile
Graded stakes races
Flat horse races for three-year-olds
Recurring sporting events established in 1873